Tuli Goon (born 21 February 1988 in Kolkata) is an Indian women footballer who currently plays as a right back for India women's national football team.

International
Goon has represented Indian Senior National Team in the 2010 South Asian Games in Bangladesh, 2010 SAFF Women's Championship and 2012 SAFF Women's Championship. She was also part of the Indian Team which played the Combined Dutch Team in 2013.

Honours

India
 SAFF Championship: 2010, 2012
 South Asian Games Gold medal: 2010

References

Indian women's footballers
1988 births
Living people
Footballers from Kolkata
India women's international footballers
Footballers at the 2014 Asian Games
Sportswomen from Kolkata
21st-century Indian women
21st-century Indian people
Women's association football fullbacks
Asian Games competitors for India
South Asian Games gold medalists for India
South Asian Games medalists in football